"Afterglow" is a song by Australian rock band INXS. It was released in April 2006 as the second single from the band's eleventh studio album, Switch.

Background and writing
The song was written by Andrew Farriss and Desmond Child, and was a tribute to Michael Hutchence, one of INXS' founders, who committed suicide in 1997. In singing the song, J. D. Fortune, winner of Rock Star: INXS, described his role in Hutchence's legacy—his "afterglow". It is a bhangra rock song written in F sharp minor.

Music video
The video for the single features actress Estella Warren and J. D. Fortune in a loft in downtown Los Angeles. J. D. Fortune walks alone on the empty Sixth Street Viaduct and is later joined by the rest of the band of INXS.

Critical reception
Music critic Matt Collar of the publication Allmusic praised the song as an "epic ballad", noting how it drew influence from U2's track "With or Without You".

The song has been described as "bhangra rock", with melody reminiscent of INXS' earlier work with Hutchence.

Chart performance
"Afterglow" peaked at number 24 in Australia on the ARIA Singles chart, spending 10 weeks in the top 50. The song reached number 22 on the US Billboard Adult Top 40 chart, and number 20 on the Hot Adult Top 40 Tracks.

Charts

Weekly charts

References

2006 singles
INXS songs
Songs written by Desmond Child
Songs written by Andrew Farriss
2005 songs
Song recordings produced by Guy Chambers
Songs about musicians